Jozua François "Tom" Naudé (15 April 1889, Middelburg, Cape Colony – 31 May 1969 Cape Town) served as acting state president of South Africa from 1967 to 1968.

A National Party politician for many years, he served as Minister of Posts and Telegraphs from 1950 to 1954, as Minister of Health from 1954 to 1958, and as Minister of Finance from 1958 to 1961. He was then appointed President of the Senate of South Africa, and in terms of the South African Constitution of 1961 he would be required ex officio under a dormant commission to act as State President of South Africa whenever that office was vacant. He was unexpectedly called upon to do this when Dr Eben Dönges, who was elected to succeed C.R. Swart as State President in 1967, suffered a stroke and fell into a coma before he could be inaugurated. Naudé was Acting State President for ten months, until Dönges died and Jim Fouché was inaugurated in his place.

Tom Naudé Technical High School in Polokwane (previously Pietersburg) was named after him.

References

1889 births
1969 deaths
Afrikaner people
Finance ministers of South Africa
Health ministers of South Africa
Herenigde Nasionale Party politicians
Ministers of Home Affairs of South Africa
National Party (South Africa) politicians
People from Middelburg, Eastern Cape
Presidents of the Senate of South Africa
Speakers of the House of Assembly (South Africa)
State Presidents of South Africa
United Party (South Africa) politicians